Gémima Joseph (born 17 October 2001) is a French athlete.

From French Guiana, Joseph was hugely influenced as a teenager when she started being coached by former international sprinter Katia Benth, and then when Benth had ill-health, Joseph was coached by Benth’s former coach Gaetan Tariaffe. Joseph has made the decision to stay mostly based away from mainland France in favour of remaining in her homeland. She studies in Cayenne for a Diploma in Accounting and Management.

She won the bronze medal in athletics 200m during the European Youth Olympic Festival in 2017, held in Győr, Hungary. She became the French junior champion in both 100m and 200m in 2019, and won silver in the 200m at the European Junior Championship in 2019.

On 16 June 2021 in Cergy-Pontoise, Joseph ran 22:77 for the 200m and became the first Frenchwoman to make the qualifying standard for the 200m at the delayed 2020 Olympic Games. In doing so, she also became the fastest Frenchwoman over the distance for seven years. Remarkably, due to the COVID-19 pandemic, the race had come for Joseph after an enforced 10 day quarantine following her arrival in France which had affected her ability to train. Earlier at the meeting she also broke her 100m personal best, by running 11:40.

References

2001 births
Living people
French Guianan female sprinters
French people of French Guianan descent
French female sprinters
Sportspeople from Cayenne
Athletes (track and field) at the 2018 Summer Youth Olympics
Athletes (track and field) at the 2020 Summer Olympics
Olympic athletes of France
21st-century French women
Athletes (track and field) at the 2022 Mediterranean Games
Mediterranean Games silver medalists for France
Mediterranean Games medalists in athletics